Colin George Barrett (29 May 1863 – 25 February 1898), was a leading jockey in the United Kingdom in the 1880s and 1890s. He was born on 29 May 1863 in Metfield, Suffolk. He was apprentice jockey to W. H. Manser at Newmarket. His first ride came in July 1877, with him riding his first winner. During his early career he could do weights as low at 5 st 7 lb (34.9 kg). He rode six winners in his first year. His first classic win came the 1885 1000 Guineas aboard Farewell. He rode the unbeaten Ormonde to victory in the 2000 Guineas in 1886 after regular jockey Fred Archer riding Saraband. In 1892 he rode Orme and La Fleche to a number of top class victories. Barrett was never champion jockey, but was second four times, including finished four winners behind Morny Cannon in 1891. He stopped riding after 1894, when his health began to fail, and died on 25 February 1898.

References

 The late George Barrett's career Otago Witness. 21 April 1898. Retrieved 28 August 2012.
 George Barrett National horse racing museum. Retrieved 28 August 2012.

British jockeys
1863 births
1898 deaths
People from Mid Suffolk District